Sledgehammer is a 1983 independent slasher film written and directed by David A. Prior. The film tells the story of a young boy who murdered his mother and her lover with a sledgehammer. Ten years after the murder and the child's mysterious disappearance, a group of teens stay in the house for a weekend when they are terrorized by the ghost of the little boy.

Sledgehammer was one of the earliest horror films to be shot on video, though not the first, a distinction claimed by Boardinghouse which was released one year earlier. However, while Boardinghouse received a limited theatrical release, Sledgehammer was originally released direct-to-video. It has retained a cult following, and was re-released on DVD in 2011 by Intervision, a sub-label of cult film distributor Severin Films.

Plot 
In a remote house, an abusive mother locks her young son in a closet, then goes into another room to meet the man she is cheating on her husband with. The man and woman intend to abandon their respective spouses, but their plans are cut short when an unseen killer appears and murders them with a sledgehammer. The bodies are found by the authorities, with the exception of the boy, who is presumed dead.

Ten years later, seven friends have rented out the house to party in. They are driven to the house in a van by a local mechanic, who leaves with the intent of picking them up afterwards. When night falls, Chuck convinces the others to participate in a séance to try and summon the spirits of the couple that died in the house, so they can learn who killed them. In actuality, the séance is an elaborate prank concocted by Chuck and Joey, but it succeeds in bringing forth the ghost of the missing boy, which appears as a towering man in a smiling translucent mask. The spirit murders Joey with a knife through the neck, then hides his body. The next day, it murders Jimmy and Carol while they are having sex, snapping Carol's neck and hitting Jimmy in the chest with a sledgehammer.

Discovering the fates of their friends, the remaining four teenagers decide to hold up in the house until morning, intending to set out for the nearest town afterwards. When the others fall asleep, John grabs a knife and goes off in search of the killer. He finds the boy's skull in a closet, a newspaper clipping mentioning his disappearance, and Carol and Jimmy's bodies seated at a table near a Satanic pentagram painted in blood. John is confronted by the ghost, and tries to fight it off, but is killed by a knife in the back. The phantom then corners Mary, and is found stabbing her to death by Chuck and Joni, having regressed to the form of the boy; the boy tells them that he had to kill his mother because she took him away from his father in order to continue her affair. The spirit assumes its adult form, knocks Chuck unconscious, and goes after Joni. Joni fends off the ghost long enough for Chuck to recover, and after a struggle, he grabs its own sledgehammer and bashes it in the face, seemingly defeating it.

Joni and Chuck leave the house as the sun rises. Unseen by them, the spirit of the boy watches them depart from the upstairs window.

Cast 
 Ted Prior as Chuck
 Linda McGill as Joni
 John Eastman as John
 Jeanine Scheer as Mary
 Tim Aguilar as Jimmy
 Sandy Brooke as Carol
 Stephen Wright as Joey
 Michael Shanahan as Lover
 Mary Mendez as Mother
 Justin Greer as The Boy
 Doug Matley as The Killer
 Ray Lawrence as The Driver

Reception 
DVD Talk, which awarded the film one and a half stars out of five, wrote, "A movie that could only have been made in the eighties, Sledgehammer is shot on video crap of the highest caliber, a veritable disasterpiece of a movie that anyone curious as to how low cult movies can go really ought to see for themselves. Horrible in every sense of the word and endlessly entertaining for all the wrong reasons". DVD Verdict described it as so "innocently and consistently incompetent that " They particularly noted its many prolonged slow motion shots and irritating synth-based soundtrack. Oh, the Horror! (which gave Sledgehammer the tag "Buy it!") said, "Most will call this crap, but others will call it charming. If you're in the latter category, you will find a lot to like, as stuff like this carries a lot of nostalgic currency. And while that doesn't cover up its obvious flaws (poor acting and a non-existent plot) the feeling it exudes is distinctive." Hysteria Lives! gave Sledgehammer two and a half stars out of five, opening its review with, "whilst this early shot-on-video oddity certainly isn't going to win any awards it is cheesy (and even sometimes a little creepy) enough fun to keep most fans of the subgenre entertained."

References

External links 
 
 

1983 films
1983 independent films
1980s mystery films
1980s slasher films
1980s teen horror films
American ghost films
Camcorder films
American slasher films
1983 horror films
Adultery in films
American haunted house films
American independent films
American teen horror films
Direct-to-video horror films
Films shot in Los Angeles
Films directed by David A. Prior
1983 directorial debut films
American supernatural horror films
Supernatural slasher films
American exploitation films
American splatter films
1980s English-language films
1980s American films
1983 direct-to-video films
English-language horror films